Nicolas Devilder was the defending champion, but he did not participate that year.

Peter Luczak won the title, defeating Yuri Schukin in the final, 3–6, 7–6(7–4), 7–6(8–6).

Seeds

Draw

Final four

Top half

Bottom half

External Links
 Main Draw
 Qualifying Draw

Poznan Porsche Open - Singles
2009 Singles